The Empire State Trail is a multi-use trail in New York State that was proposed by Governor Andrew Cuomo in January 2017 and completed in December 2020. The trail runs from Manhattan north to the Canadian border in Rouses Point near the northern tip of Lake Champlain, and also from Buffalo to Albany. At , it is the longest multi-use trail in the United States. The trail includes pre-existing trail segments, which retain their existing identity but are now co-signed as a segment of the Empire State Trail. The trail also links to other regional bicycling and hiking trails such as the Appalachian Trail, the Adirondack and Catskill Parks, the Great Lakes Seaway Trail, the Genesee Valley Greenway, and others. A segment near its southernmost part, on the Hudson River Greenway in Manhattan, is concurrent with the East Coast Greenway. The trail is used for hiking, biking, snowshoeing, cross-country skiing and in some areas snowmobiling. 

Completing the trail required 40 construction projects to create new trails and to eliminate gaps in existing segments. On December 30, 2020, Governor Cuomo announced that these construction projects were finished, and that the Empire State Trail was officially completed and open to the public.

Route
The trail is organized in three main segments: the Hudson River Valley Greenway Trail, the Erie Canalway Trail, and the Champlain Valley Trail.

The Hudson River Valley Greenway runs from New York City to Albany along numerous greenways and rail trails, including the Hudson River Greenway in Manhattan, the North County Trailway and South County Trailway in Westchester County, the Walkway Over the Hudson, the Albany–Hudson Electric Trail, and others.  It loosely follows the eastern shore of the Hudson River with a brief section in Ulster County on the western shore.  This section of trail is primarily off-road, but contains one significant on-road section between Kingston and Hudson.

The Erie Canalway Trail runs from Buffalo to Albany (via Rochester and Syracuse) along towpaths and rail trails following both the old Erie Canal and the later New York State Canal System.  After the completion of the Empire State Trail, this section is almost entirely off-road, with notable on-road gaps remaining between Clyde and Port Byron, Schuyler and Frankfort, and Cohoes and Watervliet.

The Champlain Valley Trail runs from Albany to the Canadian border in Rouses Point. This section initially follows the Champlain Canal from Albany to Whitehall, and then follows Lake Champlain to Canada. The section along the canal utilizes the Champlain Canalway Trail, but north of Whitehall the trail is entirely on-road, following State Bike Route 9 the rest of the way.

The trail connects 22 counties and many cities throughout the state, including New York City, Buffalo, Albany, and points in between. There is also a proposal to extend the trail from its southern terminus into Long Island.

Trail maintenance
The trail connects existing trail segments operated by a variety of state entities, local governments, and non-profit organizations such as the New York State Canalway Trail, Dutchess Rail Trail, Wallkill Valley Rail Trail and others. The trail maintenance activities continue to be undertaken by the entity that operates each local segment of the larger Empire State Trail.

Trails included

Hudson Valley Greenway Trail (New York City to Albany)
Hudson River Greenway
Putnam Greenway (NYC)
North County Trailway
South County Trailway
Putnam County Trailway
Maybrook Trailway
Dutchess Rail Trail
Walkway over the Hudson
Hudson Valley Rail Trail
Wallkill Valley Rail Trail
Kingston Point Rail Trail
Albany-Hudson Electric Trail

Erie Canalway Trail (Albany to Buffalo)
Mohawk-Hudson Bike-Hike Trail
New York State Canalway Trail - Erie Canalway Trails
Onondaga Creekwalk
Shoreline Trail

Champlain Valley Trail (Albany to Champlain)
Mohawk-Hudson Bike-Hike Trail
New York State Canalway Trail - Champlain Canalway Trails
Delaware Avenue-Black Bridge Trail - Van Schaick Island
Terry Gordon Trail

See also
List of trails in New York

External links
 Official site
 Interactive Map
 Open source map of cycling route
 Open source map of walking route

References

Nature reserves in New York (state)
Tourism in New York (state)
Hiking trails in New York (state)